Ethiopia competed at the 1972 Summer Olympics in Munich, West Germany. 31 competitors, all men, took part in 20 events in 3 sports.

Medalists

Athletics

Men's 100 metres
Egzi Gabre-Gabre
 First Heat — 10.89s (→ did not advance)

Men's 800 metres
Mulugetta Tadesse
 Heat — 1:47.1
 Semifinals — 1:48.9 (→ did not advance)
Shibrou Regassa
 Heat — 1:53.3 (→ did not advance)

Men's 1500 metres
Hailu Ebba
 Heat — 3:41.6
 Semifinals — 3:43.7 (→ did not advance)
Shibrou Regassa
 Heat — 3:43.6
 Semifinals — 3:41.9 (→ did not advance)

Men's 5000 metres
Tolossa Kotu
 Heat — 13:46.2 (→ did not advance)
Tekle Fitinsa
 Heat — 13:50.4 (→ did not advance)

Men's 10,000 metres
Tadesse Wolde-Medhin
 Heat — 28:45.4 (→ did not advance)

Men's 4 × 100 m Relay
Sisay Feleke, Solomon Belay, Kebede Bedasso, and Egzi Gabre-Gabre
 Heat — DNF (→ did not advance)

Boxing

Men's Bantamweight (– 54 kg)
 Mohamed Ayele 
 First Round — Lost to Koh Keun-Sang (KOR), KO-1

Men's Light Welterweight (– 63.5 kg)
Fekadu Gabre Selassie
 First Round — Lost to Kyoji Shinohara (JPN), 0:5

Cycling

Individual road race
 Tekeste Woldu — 53rd place
 Fisihasion Ghebreyesus — did not finish (→ no ranking)
 Rissom Gebre Meskei — did not finish (→ no ranking)
 Suleman Abdul Rahman — did not finish (→ no ranking)

Team time trial
 Mehari Okubamicael
 Rissom Gebre Meskei
 Fisihasion Ghebreyesus
 Tekeste Woldu

References

External links
Official Olympic Reports
International Olympic Committee results database

Nations at the 1972 Summer Olympics
1972 Summer Olympics
1972 in Ethiopian sport